Omar Al-Muqbil (born) (عمر المقبل) is a Saudi Arabian Islamic scholar, writer, researcher, preacher and professor of Islamic law at Qassim University. An alumnus of Imam Muhammad ibn Saud Islamic University and Qassim University. He studied under the Muhammad ibn al Uthaymeen, Abd al-Aziz ibn Baz and Yahya Bin Abdul Aziz Al-Yahya.

Omar bin Abdullah bin Muhammad bin Saleh was born in 1972 in Al Mithnab.

Arrest

In September 2019 he was imprisoned after criticizing the General Entertainment Authority (GEA) in a video in which he said that the GEA is “erasing the original identity of society”.

Literary works
Dr. Omar Al-Muqbil has authored a number of books and publications. including:

References

1972 births
Living people
Saudi Arabian Islamic religious leaders
Saudi Arabian prisoners and detainees
Saudi Arabian Muslims
People from Riyadh
Imam Muhammad ibn Saud Islamic University alumni
Saudi Arabian writers